The Indian Institute of Geomagnetism is an autonomous research institution established by the  Government of India's Department of Science and Technology. The facility is engaged in basic and applied research in geomagnetism, as well as allied areas of geophysics, atmospheric physics and space physics, as well as plasma physics. The institute currently operates 12 magnetic observatories  and actively participates in the Indian Antarctic Program.

History

The institute was developed as a successor of Colaba Observatory in 1971. The original Observatory was founded in 1826. Its first Director was B. N. Bhargava, appointed in 1971, and held this title until 1979.

Research
 Upper Atmosphere
 Solid Earth
 Observatory and Data Analysis
 Antarctica

The institute has collaborated with Kyoto University in Japan, the University of the Western Cape in South Africa, and the National Science Council in Taiwan. It established a World Data Center for the topic of Geomagnetism  that maintains comprehensive sets of analog and digital geomagnetic data, as well as indices of geomagnetic activity supplied from a worldwide network of magnetic observatories.

Centers and Observatories

Location of Regional Laboratories
Equatorial Geophysical Research Laboratory, (EGRL), Tirunelveli
K.S. Krishnan Geomagnetic Research Laboratory, (KSKGRL), Allahabad
NORTH EAST Geophysical Research Laboratory, (NEGRL), Shillong

Location of Magnetic Observatories
Alibag
Allahabad
Gulmarg
Jaipur
Nagpur
Pondicherry
Port Blair
Rajkot
Shillong
Silchar
Tirunelveli
Visakhapatnam

Facilities

The institute developed fluxgate magnetometers.

1. DOCTORAL PROGRAMME (Ph.D.) :

 Indian Institute of Geomagnetism (IIG) offers Doctoral Programme in Geomagnetism and Allied Fields pertinent to studies of Solid Earth, Upper Atmosphere and Observatory Data Analysis. Selected candidates will be required to do research work at its HQ and/or its regional centres (EGRL-Tirunelveli, KSKGRL-Allahabad and MO-Shillong). Indian Institute of Geomagnetism is a recognized centre for conducting research leading to Ph.D. degree by following universities in the subjects specified:
University of Mumbai (Physics)
Shivaji University, Kolhapur (Physics)
North Maharashtra University, Jalgaon (Physics, Applied Geology, Environmental Science)
SRTM University, Nanded (Geophysics, Environmental Science)
Andhra University, Visakhapatanam (Physics & Geophysics)
Manonmaniam Sundarnar University, Tirunelveli (Physics)
2. POSTDOCTORAL PROGRAMME (PDF) : Nanabhoy Moos Research Fellowship (NMRF) Indian Institute of Geomagnetism (IIG) is a premier institute of the Department of Science & Technology engaged in fundamental research in Geomagnetism and its allied fields. The institute has been able to attract young and rich scientific talent for carrying out research. To further enrich and create scientific talent in a variety of scientific disciplines in this Institute, a new Postdoctoral Research Fellowship "Nanabhoy Moos Research Fellowship (NMRF)" has been introduced.

References

External links

Physics institutes
1971 establishments in Maharashtra
Research institutes established in 1971
Research institutes in Mumbai